Swan Valley School District is a school district headquartered in Saginaw, Michigan. It is a part of the Saginaw Intermediate School District and serves  including James Township, northeastern Swan Creek Township, eastern Thomas Township. Its schools include Robert B. Havens Elementary School, Shields Elementary School, Swan Valley Middle School, and Swan Valley High School.

References

External links

 Swan Valley School District

School districts in Michigan
Saginaw Intermediate School District
Saginaw, Michigan